The yellow-bellied longbill or green-crowned longbill (Toxorhamphus novaeguineae) is a species of bird in the family Melanocharitidae.
It is found in New Guinea.
Its natural habitats are subtropical or tropical moist lowland forest and subtropical or tropical moist montane forest.

References

yellow-bellied longbill
Birds of New Guinea
yellow-bellied longbill
Taxonomy articles created by Polbot